A Sunday Afternoon on the Island of La Grande Jatte was painted from 1884 to 1886 and is Georges Seurat's most famous work. A leading example of pointillist technique, executed on a large canvas, it is a founding work of the neo-impressionist movement. Seurat's composition includes a number of Parisians at a park on the banks of the River Seine. It is in the collection of the Art Institute of Chicago.

Background

Georges Seurat painted A Sunday Afternoon between May 1884 and March 1885, and from October 1885 to May 1886, focusing meticulously on the landscape of the park and concentrating on issues of colour, light, and form. Seurat completed numerous preliminary drawings and oil sketches before completing his masterpiece. One complete painting, the study featured to the right, measures 27 3/4 x 41 in. (70.5 x 104.1 cm) and is on display in the Metropolitan Museum.

Inspired by optical effects and perception inherent in the color theories of Michel Eugène Chevreul, Ogden Rood and others, Seurat adapted this scientific research to his painting. Seurat contrasted miniature dots or small brushstrokes of colors that when unified optically in the human eye were perceived as a single shade or hue. He believed that this form of painting, called Divisionism at the time (a term he preferred) but now known as Pointillism, would make the colors more brilliant and powerful than standard brushstrokes. The use of dots of almost uniform size came in the second year of his work on the painting, 1885–86. To make the experience of the painting even more vivid, he surrounded it with a frame of painted dots, which in turn he enclosed with a pure white, wooden frame, which is how the painting is exhibited today at the Art Institute of Chicago.

The Island of la Grande Jatte is located at the very gates of Paris, lying in the Seine between Neuilly and Levallois-Perret, a short distance from where La Défense business district currently stands. Although for many years it was an industrial site, it is today the site of a public garden and a housing development. When Seurat began the painting in 1884, the island was a bucolic retreat far from the urban center.

The painting was first exhibited at the eighth (and last) Impressionist exhibition in May 1886, then in August 1886, dominating the second Salon of the Société des Artistes Indépendants, of which Seurat had been a founder in 1884. Seurat was extremely disciplined, always serious, and private to the point of secretiveness—for the most part, steering his own steady course. As a painter, he wanted to make a difference in the history of art and with La Grande Jatte, Seurat was immediately acknowledged as the leader of a new and rebellious form of Impressionism called Neo-Impressionism.

Interpretation

Seurat's painting was a mirror impression of his own painting, Bathers at Asnières, completed shortly before, in 1884. Whereas the bathers in that earlier painting are doused in light, almost every figure on La Grande Jatte appears to be cast in shadow, either under trees or an umbrella, or from another person. For Parisians, Sunday was the day to escape the heat of the city and head for the shade of the trees and the cool breezes that came off the river. And at first glance, the viewer sees many different people relaxing in a park by the river. On the right, a fashionable couple, the woman with the sunshade and the man in his top hat, are on a stroll. On the left, another woman who is also well dressed extends her fishing pole over the water. There is a small man with the black hat and thin cane looking at the river, and a white dog with a brown head, a woman knitting, a man playing a trumpet, two soldiers standing at attention as the musician plays, and a woman hunched under an orange umbrella. Seurat also painted a man with a pipe, a woman under a parasol in a boat filled with rowers, and a couple admiring their infant child.

Some of the characters are doing curious things. The lady on the right side has a pet monkey on a leash. A lady on the left near the river bank is fishing. The area was known at the time as being a place to procure prostitutes among the bourgeoisie, a likely allusion of the otherwise odd "fishing" rod. In the painting's center stands a little girl dressed in white (who is not in a shadow), who stares directly at the viewer of the painting. This may be interpreted as someone who is silently questioning the audience.

In the 1950s, historian and Marxist philosopher Ernst Bloch drew social and political significance from Seurat's La Grande Jatte. The historian's focal point was Seurat's mechanical use of the figures and what their static nature said about French society at the time. Afterward, the work received heavy criticism by many that centered on the artist's mathematical and robotic interpretation of modernity in Paris.

According to historian of Modernism William R. Everdell: 

The border of the painting is, unusually, in inverted color, as if the world around them is also slowly inverting from the way of life they have known. Seen in this context, the boy who bathes on the other side of the river bank at Asnières appears to be calling out to them, as if to say, "We are the future. Come and join us".

Painting materials
Seurat painted the La Grande Jatte in three distinct stages. In the first stage, which was started in 1884, he mixed his paints from several individual pigments and was still using dull earth pigments such as ochre or burnt sienna. In the second stage, during 1885 and 1886, Seurat dispensed with the earth pigments and also limited the number of individual pigments in his paints. This change in his palette was due to his application of the advanced color theories of his time. His intention was to paint small dots or strokes of pure color that would then mix on the retina of the beholder to achieve the desired color impression instead of the usual practice of mixing individual pigments.

Seurat's palette consisted of the usual pigments of his time such as cobalt blue, emerald green and vermilion. Additionally, he used the then new pigment zinc yellow (zinc chromate), predominantly for yellow highlights in the sunlit grass in the middle of the painting but also in mixtures with orange and blue pigments. In the century and more since the painting's completion, the zinc yellow has darkened to brown—a color degeneration that was already showing in the painting in Seurat's lifetime. The discoloration of the originally bright yellow zinc yellow (zinc chromate) to a brownish color is due to the chemical reaction of the chromate ions to orange-colored dichromate ions. In the third stage during 1888–89 Seurat added the colored borders to his composition.

The results of investigation into the discoloration of this painting have been combined with further research into natural aging of paints to digitally rejuvenate the painting.

Acquisition by the Art Institute of Chicago

In 1923, Frederic Bartlett was appointed trustee of the Art Institute of Chicago. He and his second wife, Helen Birch Bartlett, loaned their collection of French Post-Impressionist and Modernist art to the museum. It was Mrs. Bartlett who had an interest in French and avant-garde artists and influenced her husband's collecting tastes. Sunday Afternoon on the Island of La Grande Jatte was purchased on the advice of the Art Institute of Chicago's curatorial staff in 1924.

In conceptual artist Don Celender's 1974–75 book Observation and Scholarship Examination for Art Historians, Museum Directors, Artists, Dealers and Collectors, it is claimed that the institute paid $24,000 for the work (over $354,000 in 2018 dollars).

In 1958, the painting was loaned for the only time: to the Museum of Modern Art in New York. On 15 April 1958, a fire there, which killed one person on the second floor of the museum, forced the evacuation of the painting, which had been on a floor above the fire, to the Whitney Museum, which adjoined MoMA at the time.

In popular culture

The painting is the basis for the 1984 Broadway musical Sunday in the Park with George by Stephen Sondheim and James Lapine, which tells a fictionalized story of the painting's creation. Subsequently, the painting is sometimes referred to by the misnomer "Sunday in the Park".

The painting is prominently featured in the 1986 comedy film Ferris Bueller's Day Off, in a scene later parodied, among others, in Looney Tunes: Back in Action, Family Guy, and Muppet Babies.

In Topiary Park (formerly Old Deaf School Park) in Columbus, Ohio, sculptor James T. Mason re-created the painting in topiary form; the installation was completed in 1989.

Related works by Seurat

See also
List of paintings by Georges Seurat
100 Great Paintings

References

Further reading
 
 William R. Everdell, The First Moderns: Profiles in the Origins of Twentieth Century Thought (Chicago: University of Chicago Press).

External links

 Seurat and the Making of La Grande Jatte
 La Grande Jatte – Inspiration, Analysis and Critical Reception
 A Sunday on La Grande Jatte — 1884 at The Art Institute of Chicago
 Georges Seurat, 1859–1891, MoMA exhibition catalog
 Georges Seurat, Sunday Afternoon at La Grande Jatte, ColourLex
 

1886 paintings
Dogs in art
Monkeys in art
Musical instruments in art
Paintings by Georges Seurat
Paintings in the collection of the Art Institute of Chicago
Post-impressionist paintings
Ships in art